Kylie InGold (born September 1962) is an Australian artist, a painter of the fairy and fantasy genre. Her painting career began in the early 1980s and has endured as one of Australia's most popular contemporary fairy artists. She studied fashion design at the Gold Coast Institute of TAFE.

InGold predominantly works in oil and acrylic. Her paintings have been exhibited at numerous art galleries in Australia, appeared on the covers of magazines, Tarot cards and prints.

References

 Doreen Virtue, Healing with the Fairies Oracle Cards Guidebook. Hay House, Inc, 2001.
 Bewusst Sein, Issue 221, June 2006 p. 25

External links
Official website
Australian Fairy Artists Society

1962 births
Living people
Fantasy artists
Australian women painters
Australian speculative fiction artists
20th-century Australian women artists
20th-century Australian artists
21st-century Australian women artists
21st-century Australian artists